St. Mary's Catholic School is a co-educational private, Roman Catholic high school in Lake Leelanau, Michigan.  It is located in the Roman Catholic Diocese of Gaylord.

Athletics 

Fall Sports

BOYS
Cross Country (7-12)
Football (7-12) co-op with Suttons Bay
Soccer (7-12) co-op with Northbay

GIRLS
Cross Country (7-12)
Soccer (7-8 co-ed) co-op with Northbay
Volleyball (7-12)

Winter Sports

BOYS
Basketball (4-12)
Alpine Skiing (9-12) co-op with Glen Lake

GIRLS
Basketball (4-12)
Alpine Skiing (9-12) co-op with Glen Lake

Spring Sports

BOYS
Baseball (9-12) Northport co-ops with St. Mary
Track & Field (7-12) co-op with Suttons Bay

GIRLS
Soccer (7-12) co-op with Northbay
Softball (8-12)
Track & Field (7-12) co-op with Suttons Bay

References

External links 
 School Website

Roman Catholic Diocese of Gaylord
Catholic secondary schools in Michigan
Schools in Leelanau County, Michigan
Educational institutions established in 1887
1887 establishments in Michigan